Myriogenospora is a genus of fungi in the family Clavicipitaceae.

References

Sordariomycetes genera
Clavicipitaceae